Jack Mackesy (24 February 1890 – 4 May 1963) was an English footballer who played as a half back and an inside forward.

Career
Born in Deptford in 1890, Mackesy began his career with local club Deptford Invicta, before signing for West Ham United in 1912. On 22 April 1912, Mackesy scored on his West Ham debut in a 3–1 away loss against Swindon Town in the Southern League. Following the outbreak of World War I, Mackesy captained West Ham's reserves in the London Combination, scoring 11 goals in 55 appearances. Following the culmination of the war, and West Ham's election into the Football League, Mackesy remained with the club, making ten Second Division appearances over the course of three years.

References

1890 births
1963 deaths
Association football forwards
Association football midfielders
English footballers
Footballers from Deptford
West Ham United F.C. players
Southern Football League players
English Football League players